Jacquavius Dennard Smith (born May 1, 2000), professionally known as 9lokkNine (pronounced and formerly typeset GlokkNine), is an American rapper. He is best known for his feature on YNW Melly's 2019 single "223's", which peaked at number 34 on the Billboard Hot 100. He signed to Cash Money Records in 2018 and is also known for his own single "10 Percent" with its video released in August 2021.

Career 
9lokkNine released his first mixtape, Kold Face Kold Case with nine tracks on January 2, 2018. He released his second mixtape, Bloodshells Revenge with 18 tracks on April 17, 2018. On May 8, 2018, 9lokkNine released a music video for his single "I Don't Need No Help". On July 23, 2018, he released his 17-track mixtape, Loyalty Kill Love. On August 3, 2018, he signed to Cash Money Records and Republic Records. According to a press release, the contract was worth $2 million. On December 19, 2018, he released the 11-track mixtape, Lil Glokk That Stole Khristmas. In April 2019, 9lokkNine released his single "Party Pooper". 9lokkNine was featured on a YNW Melly track named "223's", though he was the one to originally release it as a part of his December 2018 mixtape, Lil Glokk That Stole Khristmas. The song became a sensation when it was popularized by the mobile app TikTok where numerous popular creators took to dancing to the song.

On October 25, 2019, 9lokkNine released his 16-track mixtape Mind of Destruction, which served as his first official mixtape release on Cash Money and Republic. On February 5, 2020, he released his single "Moods".
9lokkNine performed at the 2018 Rolling Loud Festival on May 13, 2018, in Miami, Florida.

Legal issues 
In September 2015, Smith, who was 15 years old at the time, was arrested in connection to a shooting that left a 17-year-old hospitalized. He was charged with aggravated battery with a firearm and unlawful discharge of a firearm and also had a violation of probation for trespassing. He was then taken to the Orange Regional Juvenile Detention Center.

On October 3, 2018, Smith was arrested on multiple charges, including possession of a concealed weapon by a convicted delinquent, grand theft in the third degree, and possession of less than 20 grams of marijuana.

On May 31, 2019, Smith was arrested in Orlando, Florida, and charged with multiple counts including possession of marijuana and illegal firearm possession.

On January 3, 2020, Smith was arrested in Miami, Florida, and charged with carrying a concealed weapon.

On July 24, 2020, he was arrested in Orlando and charged with attempted second-degree murder.

On October 8, 2020, he was arrested in Orlando on an outstanding warrant related to charges for possession of a firearm by a convicted felon and possession of a short-barreled rifle.

In January 2021, he was charged with multiple counts of attempted second-degree murder.

On June 21, 2021, he was arrested on charges including racketeering and conspiracy to commit racketeering.

On December 15, 2021, Smith was sentenced to seven years in federal prison after pleading guilty to identity theft and possession of unregistered firearms charges. He had fraudulently applied for and received benefits through the Paycheck Protection Act under another person's name.

Discography

Mixtapes

Singles

As lead artist

As a featured artist

Notes

References

2000 births
Living people
21st-century American rappers
Rappers from Florida
People from Orlando, Florida
People from Orange County, Florida
African-American male rappers
American people of Bahamian descent
Cash Money Records artists
Mumble rappers
21st-century American male musicians
21st-century African-American musicians
20th-century African-American people
People charged with racketeering
People charged with attempted murder
People charged with battery